Dundas is a civil parish in Kent County, New Brunswick, Canada.

For governance purposes it is divided between the towns of Champdoré and Grand-Bouctouche and the rural communities of Beausoleil and Maple Hills; Maple Hills is a member of the Southeast Regional Service Commission, while the others belong to the Kent RSC.

Prior to the 2023 governance reform, the parish was divided between the village of Saint-Antoine, the rural community of Cocagne and the local service districts of Grande-Digue, Grand Saint-Antoine, Shediac Bridge-Shediac River, the parish of Dundas, and (through its Saint-Grégoire special service area) the parish of Wellington. Cocagne, Grande-Digue, and Shediac Bridge-Shediac River, and most of the Dundas Parish LSD are now part of Beausoleil, Saint-Antoine and Grand Saint-Antoine part of Champdoré, while the community of Dundas in the western end of the parish is part of Maple Hills.

The parish was informally referred to as Notre-Dame after one its communities.

Origin of name
One possible honouree is Robert Saunders Dundas, First Lord of the Admiralty at the time of its erection. Another is Ann Dundas, wife of Sir Howard Douglas, Lieutenant Governor of New Brunswick when the parish was erected.

History
Dundas was erected in 1827 from Wellington Parish.

In 1828 the boundary with Wellington was adjusted to run along grant lines near Després Road and west from there.

In 1862 the boundary with Wellington was adjusted to its modern line.

Boundaries
Dundas Parish is bounded:

on the northwest by a line beginning on the shore of Northumberland Strait near Bar-de-Cocagne, then running south 72º 30' west to the western line of a grant on the western side of the junction of Gérard Road and Robichaud Cross Road, a bit north of Robichaud Cross Road, then southwesterly along the grant line to the northwestern line of a grant straddling Gérard Road, part of a tier of grants on the northwestern side of Alexandrina Road, then southwesterly along the rear line of the tier and its prolongation to Route 490;
on the east by Northumberland Strait;
on the south by the Westmorland County line;
on the west by Route 490;
including all islands in front of the parish.

Communities
Communities at least partly within the parish; bold indicates a municipality or incorporated rural community; italics indicate a name no longer in official use

Alexandrina
Caissie Cape
Dufourville
Dundas
Goudalie
Grande-Digue
Notre-Dame
Poirier
Saint-Antoine
Whites Settlement

rural community of Cocagne
Bourgeois
Breau-Village
Cap-de-Cocagne
Cocagne
Cocagne Cove
Cocagne-Nord (Gueguen, Lower Gueguen)
Cocagne-Sud
Cormierville
Côte-d'Or
Després-Village
Saint-Marcel
Saint-Martin-de-Kent

Bodies of water
Bodies of water at least partly in the parish:
Rivière à l'Anguille
Cocagne River
Northumberland Strait
Cocagne Harbour
La Passe

Islands
Islands at least partly in the parish:
Cocagne Island
Surette Island

Demographics
Parish population total does not include village of Saint-Antoine and (after 2011) rural community of Cocagne

Population
Population trend

Language
Mother tongue (2016)

See also
List of parishes in New Brunswick

Notes

References

External links
 District de services locaux de Grande-Digue

Parishes of Kent County, New Brunswick
Local service districts of Kent County, New Brunswick